Safiullah Khan (born March 1979) is a Pakistani footballer, who is  a member of Pakistan national football team.

Khan is a forward who earned his first international cap during the IndoPak football series in 2005. He also got the Highest Goal-Scorer Award in the AFC Challenge Cup qualifiers 2009.

References

1979 births
Living people
Pakistani footballers
Pakistan international footballers
Association football forwards